PMCS or PMCs may refer to:
Paper Mario: Color Splash, a 2016 Wii U game
Preventive maintenance checks and services
Polar mesospheric clouds
Post micturition convulsion syndrome
Private military companies

See also
PMC (disambiguation)